The Rabat–Salé tramway is a tram system in the Moroccan agglomeration of Rabat and Salé cities which opened on 23 May 2011.

Network
It has two lines (1 and 2) with a combined section and frequency of 8 minutes in peak hours. It has a calculated ridership of 172,000 passengers per day. It is operated by Transdev with Alstom Citadis articulated modern trams consisting of two 5-piece sections. The lines use the special new Hassan II bridge over the Bou Regreg and pass near Rabat-Ville station and through the specially arranged aperture in the medieval city's wall. Expansion of existing lines and two more lines (3 and 4) were under construction with opening scheduled for 2019 or 2020. The tramway is operated under contract by Transdev.

From the 1910s to the 1930s an old steam and oil tram network existed in Rabat.

Lines 
L1: exists and is under extension.
L2: exists and is under extension.

History
Construction of the network began in February 2007 and opened on 23 May 2011. In January 2017, a seven-kilometre extension to the network was announced. The extension opened on 16 February 2022.

Tram Mobile 
On 11 October 2021, the Rabat-Salé Tramway Company launched its first mobile app, allowing passengers to purchase and validate tickets, as well as pay for other services such as student and public subscriptions. Tram Mobile will be scalable to include other details such as real-time information on tram arrivals, and the availability of slots in dedicated parking.

Rolling stock
To commence operations, 44 Alstom Citadis trams were purchased. In 2017 it was announced that a further 22 would be delivered in 2019.

See also
 Casablanca tramway
 Rail transport in Morocco

References

External links

Official website 

Tram transport in Morocco
Transdev
Transport in Rabat
Transport in Salé
Town tramway systems by city
2011 establishments in Morocco